John Arne Markussen (born 20 May 1953) is a Norwegian journalist and newspaper editor. He was born in Repvåg, Nordkapp. He was journalist for the newspaper Altaposten from 1971 to 1976, and for Dagbladet from 1977. From 2011 he was appointed chief editor of  Dagbladet. Among his books are Norske redaktører - voktere av enigheten from 1979, and Frihet og frykt - nærbilder av USA from 1996.

References

1953 births
Living people
People from Nordkapp
Norwegian newspaper editors
Dagbladet people